The FACE risk profile is a commercial mental health assessment tool that is part of a collection of tools produced by Imosphere.

Nomenclature
FACE stands for "Functional Analysis of Care Environments".

Imosphere produces several toolkits to assess risk and needs in health and social care, mental health, people with learning disabilities, young people, and people with substance misuse problems; to assess peoples' mental capacity, and as an assessment of needs for telecare.

The FACE risk profile is part of the toolkits for calculating risks for people with mental health problems, learning disabilities, substance misuse problems, young and older people, and in perinatal services.

References

 
  
 
 
 
 
 

Mental disorders screening and assessment tools